The 2010–11 Missouri Mavericks season was the second season of the Central Hockey League (CHL) franchise in Independence, Missouri.

Regular season

Conference standings

Playoffs 

In the playoffs, the Mavericks were eliminated in Game four by the Colorado Eagles in the best-of-five Turner Conference semi-finals.

2010-2011 Missouri Mavericks Playoff Game Log

Awards and records

Awards

Milestones

Transactions

Trades

Player Signings

Waived/Retired/Placements on Team Suspension

See also
 2010–11 CHL season

References

External links
 2010–11 Missouri Mavericks Regular Season at Pointstreak.com
 2010–11 Missouri Mavericks Postseason at Pointstreak.com

Missouri Mavericks seasons
Missouri
Missouri
2010 in sports in Missouri
2011 in sports in Missouri